William Jacques Vainqueur (born 19 November 1988) is a French former professional footballer who played as a midfielder. He mostly played as a central or defensive midfielder position.

Club career

FC Nantes
Born in Neuilly-sur-Marne, a commune in the eastern suburbs of Paris, Vainqueur joined Noisy-le-Grand FC at the age of 8. In 2001, he moved to the youth system of AJ Auxerre and spent one year there, before being released. After his release by Auxerre, he continued to train, to work on himself, leading to re–join Bussy-Saint-Georges FC. There, he was discovered at the age 14 by FC Nantes. However, joining FC Nantes saw him Vainqueur move away, as he saw them once every month.

Having progressed through the youth system at Nantes, Vainqueur made his senior debut during the 2006–07 Ligue 1 season, which came against Olympique de Marseille, where he started the match before coming off in the 69th minute for Miloš Dimitrijević, in a 0–0 draw on 18 February 2007. He soon become involved in a number of matches following an absent of Alioum Saidou, though he faced setback with injury. Although the club were eventually relegated to Ligue 2 at the end of the season, Vainqueur went on to make ten appearances for the side and signed his first professional contract with the Ligue 1 club shortly after.

However, ahead of the 2007–08 season, Vainqueur was sidelined for six months after rupturing his cruciate ligaments on his right knee while on duty for France U19. By January, he returned to training after being on the sidelines. However, he suffered another injury with a broken cruciate ligament. It wasn't until on 10 March 2008 when he made his first appearance of the season, coming on as a substitute, in a 1–0 win over Grenoble Foot. He went on to make five appearances in the 2007–08 season, as FC Nantes were promoted back to Ligue 1 at the first attempt.

In the 2008–09 season, Vainqueur didn't make his first appearance of the season on 20 September 2008, where he came on as a substitute, in a 2–0 win over Valenciennes. However, he struggled for the most of the season on the substitute bench, as well as, his own injury concerns. By the second half of the season, Vainqueur soon regained his first team place, in the defensive midfield position. Despite suffering injuries and suspension during the 2008–09 season, FC Nantes were relegated back to Ligue 2 after finishing 19th on the table and he went on to make eighteen appearances in all competitions.

In the 2009–10 season, Vainqueur began to feature more in the first team and started in a number of matches. In a 5–0 win over FC Istres on 21 August 2009, he was sent–off for a second bookable offence, having been booked twice during the match. After serving a two match suspension, he returned to the first team on 18 September 2009, in a 1–1 draw against SC Bastia. On 1 October 2009, Vainqueur signed a contract with the club, keeping him until 2013. Then, on 23 October 2009, he scored his first goal of the side, in a 2–1 win over Dijon FCO. Although he was sidelined on four more occasions this season, Vainqueur regained his first team place throughout the 2009–10 season, as he went on to make twenty–nine appearances and scoring once in all competitions.

After missing the start of the 2010–11 season, due to injury, Vainqueur made his first appearance of the season, where he started the whole game, in a 2–0 loss against Le Mans in the opening game of the season. Shortly after, he suffered a thigh strain that saw him miss two matches. Vainqueur returned to the first team on 20 September 2010, where he started and played 58 minutes, in a 2–1 loss against Reims. On 10 December 2010, Vainqueur played a role against Le Havre when he was involved in a goal that led to opposition player Loïc Nestor scoring an own goal, which was the only goal of the game. Then, in a 3–0 loss against Évian Thonon Gaillard on 29 January 2011, he was sent off in the 62nd minute for a professional foul that led him receiving a straight red card. Despite being on the sidelines over injuries and suspensions, Vainqueur continued to be featured in the first team as the 2010–11 season progressed. At the end of the season, he went on to make twenty–nine appearances in all competitions.

In the 2011–12 season, Vainqueur continued to feature in the first team for Nantes and appeared in every match by the end of August.

Standard Liège

On 30 August 2011, Vainqueur was transferred to Belgian Pro League side Standard Liège, where he signed a five-year contract with the Belgian club. The transfer move reportedly cost 1.7 million euros. He was previously linked a move to clubs, such as, Olympiacos, AS Nancy and FC Lorient before he joined Standard Liège.

After starting out on the substitute bench, Vainqueur made his Standard Liège debut on 15 September 2011, where he started the whole game, in a 0–0 against Hannover 96 in the UEFA Europa League Group Stage. Three days later, on 17 September 2011, Vainqueur made his league debut for the club, where he started the whole game, in a 3–0 loss against Genk. Since joining the club, he quickly established himself in the starting eleven, playing in the defensive–midfield position. It wasn't until on 18 January 2018 when Vainqueur scored his first goal for the club, in a 4–2 loss against Lierse, as Standard Liège lose 5–4 on aggregate in the quarter–finals of Belgian Cup. Weeks later on 4 February 2012, he was sent–off for a second bookable offence, in a 2–0 win over Lierse, resulting a one–man ban. His performance saw him being named Nieuwsblad's Team of the Season in March 2012. Despite missing several matches during the 2011–12 season, Vainqueur finished his first season at Standard Liège, making thirty–five appearances and scoring once in all competitions.

In the 2012–13 season, Vainqueur continued to remain in the first team, playing out in the defensive midfield position at the start of the season. It wasn't until on 4 November 2012 when he scored his first goal of the season, in a 2–0 win over OH Leuven. His performance attracted interest from Premier League side Fulham, who wanted to sign him. Despite the transfer speculation, he scored two goals in two matches on 2 December 2012 and 7 December 2012 against Waasland-Beveren and Charleroi. In a 0–0 draw against Gent, Vainqueur was sent–off for a second bookable offence, resulting a one match ban. On 12 April 2013, he scored his third goal of the season, in a 4–3 win over Zulte Waregem. After the match, his goal against Zulte Waregem was voted number for the Goal of the Week by newspaper Nieuwsblad following a vote. Towards the end of the 2012–13 season, Vainqueur was given a captaincy, including a 7–0 win over Gent on 26 May 2013 to help the club qualify for the Europa League next season. Having played down claims that Standard Liege would not win the league (which he was correct), the club went on to finish fourth place. He was also nominated for the player of the Year in Belgium but lost out to Club Brugge's Carlos Bacca. Despite being sidelined during the 2012–13 season, Vainqueur went on to make thirty–nine appearances and scoring four times in all competitions.

Ahead of the 2013–14 season, Vainqueur spoken out that he wanted to leave Standard Liège, citing delays of contract negotiations. This led interests from foreign clubs, including rivals, Anderlecht. He was considering having his contract with Standard Liège terminated by using a law of 78. In an unexpected turn of an event, Vainqueur made a U-turn by signing a new contract, keeping him until 2016. He made his first appearance of the season, where he started and played 73 minutes, in a 3–1 win over KR Reykjavík in the first leg of UEFA Europa League Second Round. During the match, however, he suffered a thigh injury and was sidelined for several weeks. It wasn't until on 1 September 2013 when he returned to the first team from injury, in a 2–0 win over K.V. Kortrijk. After returning to the first team, Vainqueur established himself in the starting eleven for the side. Vainqueur was then sent–off on 27 October 2013, which involved an incident with Luka Milivojević, in a 1–1 draw against Anderlecht. After the match, the Disputes Committee of the KBVB decided not charge any actions on him. After being suspended for one match, Vainqueur scored on his return on 1 December 2013, in a 5–0 win over Lierse. However, near the end of a league game against Lierse, Vainqueur received a red card when he accidentally kicked an opponent in the face. During a 2–0 win over Oostende on 18 January 2014, he made a tough tackle on Sébastien Siani but wasn't booked; after the match, the Disputes Committee of the KBVB, again, decided not charge any actions on him despite proof claims on television. After finishing second place in the league, Vainqueur hinted about leaving the club in the summer of 2014. Despite being suspended on two occasions later in the 2013–14 season, Vainqueur continuously remained in the starting eleven for the side and went on to make thirty–six appearances and scoring once in all competitions. For his performance at the end of the 2013–14 season, he was awarded UGH Ecarlate trophy, a Player of the Year award voted for by Standard Liège fans.

Dynamo Moscow

On 27 June 2014, Dynamo Moscow announced signing Vainqueur on a long-term deal. Upon joining the club, he said that he consulted his former teammate Mehdi Carcela, who moved to Russia to play for Anzhi Makhackala three years ago before returning to Standard Liège, about moving to Russia and insisted of not being afraid facing competitions at Dynamo Moscow.

Vainqueur made his Dynamo Moscow debut, where he started the whole game, in a 1–1 draw against Hapoel Ironi Kiryat Shmona in the first leg of the UEFA Europa League third round. They eventually went through in the second leg after beating them 2–1. He made his league debut for the club on 4 August 2014, where he played 63 minutes before being substituted, in a 7–3 win over FC Rostov. Vainqueur played in both leg of the UEFA Europa League play–offs round against AC Omonia but was sent–off in the second leg for second bookable offence, as Dynamo Moscow went through by beating 4–3 on aggregate. Throughout the UEFA Europa League Group Stage, he helped the side win all the matches to reach the knockout stage despite playing five times in the Group Stage. It wasn't until on 4 April 2015 when Vainqueur scored his first goal for the club, in a 2–2 draw against Lokomotiv Moscow. Then, on 25 May 2015, he scored again, in a 2–2 draw against Arsenal Tula. Throughout the 2014–15 season, Vainqueur was featured in the first team for a number of matches, as he went on to make forty–one appearances and scoring two times in all competitions. However, during the season, he received criticism from Manager Stanislav Cherchesov for committing several fouls and received a warning as a result.

However, in the 2015–16 season, Vainqueur played one match for the side, which was against Mordovia Saransk on 25 July 2015. This was partly because he spent the number of matches on the substitute bench. Towards the end of August, his future at Dynamo Moscow was in doubt following the club's expulsion from playing European Football this season. It came after when the club is keen on selling him.

A.S. Roma
On 31 August 2015, Vainqueur moved to Serie A side Roma for an undisclosed fee. Upon joining the club, he became the tenth French player to join Roma and was given a number twenty–one shirt.

However, he started off his Roma career on the substitute bench in a number of matches, due to strong competitions in the midfield positions, as well as, Rudi Garcia's formation. Vainqueur made his debut for the club, where he came on as a substitute for injured Seydou Keita in the 21st minute and went on to play the whole game, in a 5–1 win over Carpi on 26 September 2015. Three days later, on 29 September 2015, he came on as a substitute for Iago Falque in the 39th minute and went on to play the whole game, in a 3–2 loss against BATE Borisov. In two matches between 20 December 2015 and 6 January 2016 against Genoa and ChievoVerona respectively, Vainqueur played a role when he set up two goals in two separate matches, winning 2–0 and drawing 3–3 respectively. For the rest of the 2015–16 season, Vainqueur continued remain out of the first team, due to being on the substitute bench, as well as, his own injury concerns. At the end of the 2015–16 season, he went on to make twenty–two appearances in all competitions for Roma.

Throughout the summer transfer window, with no first team appearances, Vainqueur was linked a move away from Roma, as clubs from Europe were interested in signing him. This also included Standard Liège.

Olympique de Marseille (loan)
On 31 August 2016, Vainqueur joined French club Marseille on a season-long loan deal. He revealed that he grew up supporting Olympique de Marseille as a young boy.

Vainqueur made his Olympique de Marseille debut, where he started the match and played 68 minutes before being substituted, in a 3–2 loss against OGC Nice on 11 September 2016. Since joining the club, he quickly established himself in the first team for the side. However, in mid–October, he suffered a hamstring injury that kept him out throughout the month. It wasn't until on 20 November 2016 when he returned to the first team from injury, in a 1–0 win over SM Caen. Vainqueur then regained his first team place, where he played in the defensive midfield. In a match against Lille on 18 December 2016, he set up a goal for Florian Thauvin to score the club's second goal of the game, in a 2–0 win. Despite missing two more matches later in the season, Vainqueur went on to make thirty–three appearances in all competitions.

Despite keen on joining the club on a permanent basis at the end of the 2016–17 season, the club did not make a permanent offer on Vainqueur.

Antalyaspor
On 4 September 2017, Vainqueur moved to Süper Lig side Antalyaspor on a three-year contract. The move reported to have cost 500,000 euros. Upon joining the club, he said he was offered a chance to join Galatasaray but opted to join Antalyaspor. He was also given a number nineteen shirt.

Vainqueur made his Antalyaspor debut on 15 September 2017, where he started the match before coming off at half time, in a 2–0 win over Kayserispor. However, he suffered two separate injuries between mid–October and early–November. As a result, he failed to make an impact for the side, having played 715 minutes in ten matches by the end of the year. While on the sidelines from injury, his contract at Antalyaspor was then terminated on 31 January 2018. Unfortunately, he remained at the club after decided against following some of his teammates left the club, as a result of the club's financial problems. Vainqueur made his return on 19 February 2018, where he came on as a late substitute, in a 2–1 win over Kayserispor. However, towards the end of the 2017–18 season, he was sidelined, due to suspension and injuries. He went on to make twenty appearances in all competitions at his first season at the club.

Ahead of the 2018–19 season, it was reported that Vainqueur was released by the club once again. However, he stayed at the club in the end. Nevertheless, Vainqueur was linked a move away from the club. Although he continued to remain in the first team. However, Vainqueur suffered an injury.

Monaco (loan)
On 9 January 2019, Antalyaspor announced that Vainqueur joined Monaco on loan until the end of the 2018–19 season.

Toulouse (loan)
On 26 June 2019, Vainqueur joined to Toulouse on loan until 30 June 2020.

International career
Vainqueur is eligible to play for either France and Haiti. It was made clear that Vainqueur was interested playing for France, but was never called up.

Youth career
Vainquerer made his first called up in April 2007 for the France U19 for a match against Congo U19. However, his appearance in a 5–2 win over Serbia U19 on 16 July 2007 saw him played 28 minutes after rupturing his cruciate ligaments on his right knee. He went on to make three appearances for the France U19 side.

In March 2009, Vainqueur was called up to the France U21 squad. He made his France U21 debut on 27 March 2009, where he started the match, in a 3–0 win over Estonia U21.

Personal life
Vainqueur is of Haitian descent. Growing up, he revealed that he spent his holidays, going to Haiti. Growing up in Neuilly-sur-Marne, a commune in the eastern suburbs of Paris, Vainqueur revealed that he grew in dangerous part of Neuilly-sur-Marne and saw his friends were doing drugs or ended up in hospital. In addition to speaking French, he speaks English.

In September 2008, Vainqueur became a father for the first time, when his girlfriend gave birth to a baby girl, Kayci. Six years later, he became a father for a second time with a baby boy, Kayes. Vainqueur is a Muslim. He stated that if he didn't made it as a footballer, he wanted it to become an architect and designer. His father-in-law is Abdoulaye Ka.

During his time at Dynamo Moscow, he was mentioned by his Igor Tsarush about the situation, regarding Racism in Russia, quoting: "Somehow Vainqueur asked why there are so few black people on the streets? I explained to him that when France conquered the colonies, he did it in Africa. And we had union republics, and we have more residents from there." He spoke out about the city of Moscow: " oscow is not at all what exists in the stereotypes of many Europeans. It is commonly believed that this is an old city, cold, somewhat archaic. In any case, this image was formed before my first visit to Russia. As soon as I flew to Moscow, I realized what kind of nonsense this was."

References

External links
 
 
 

1988 births
French Muslims
Haitian Muslims
Living people
People from Neuilly-sur-Marne
Footballers from Seine-Saint-Denis
French footballers
France youth international footballers
France under-21 international footballers
Association football midfielders
FC Nantes players
Standard Liège players
FC Dynamo Moscow players
A.S. Roma players
Olympique de Marseille players
Antalyaspor footballers
AS Monaco FC players
Toulouse FC players
Ligue 1 players
Ligue 2 players
Belgian Pro League players
Russian Premier League players
Serie A players
Süper Lig players
French expatriate footballers
Expatriate footballers in Belgium
Expatriate footballers in Italy
Expatriate footballers in Monaco
Expatriate footballers in Russia
Expatriate footballers in Turkey
French expatriate sportspeople in Belgium
French expatriate sportspeople in Italy
French expatriate sportspeople in Monaco
French expatriate sportspeople in Russia
French expatriate sportspeople in Turkey
Black French sportspeople
French sportspeople of Haitian descent